This article documents the timeline of transmission of COVID-19 during the COVID-19 pandemic in New Zealand throughout 2023.

Transmission timeline
Data about the previous day is extracted from the Institute of Environmental Science and Research's database at 9:00 am weekly and is publicly released by the Ministry of Health around 1:00 pm on Monday weekly.

January

On 9 January, the Health Ministry confirmed that the XBB.1.5 variant of COVID-19 had been detected in New Zealand with two cases. There were 2,424 new community cases on 9 January, compared to over 4,000 reported on 4 January.

On 16 January, 1 News reported that a child aged 10 years and an individual aged between 10 and 19 years were among the 57 deaths reported between 9 and 15 January. 333 COVID-19 cases were hospitalised with eight in intensive care.

February

On 9 February, Medsafe approved a version of Pfizer's pediatric vaccine for children aged under the age of five years.

On 20 February, Statistics New Zealand confirmed that COVID-19 had caused a 10 percent surge in the death toll in 2022. The 2022 death toll in New Zealand stood at 38,574; compared with 34,932 in 2021. Of these deaths, 2,400 deaths in 2022 were attributed to COVID-19. Statistics NZ population estimates and projections manager Michael MacAskill also stated that the increased death toll in 2022 reflected New Zealand's ageing population, following similar trends in Canada, the United Kingdom, and United States.

On 27 February, the Ministry of Health confirmed there had been 40 COVID-related deaths over the past week including one person under the age of 10 and one person in their 20s. 200 COVID-19 cases remained in hospital including three in intensive care.

March

On 6 March, the Canterbury Region reported the highest number of cases in New Zealand, with 2,346 in the past week. The Southern District came second, reporting 1,251 in the past week. The Waitemata District came third place, reporting 1,197 cases in the past week. 177 cases remained hospitalised, with one patient in intensive care. Of the 18 deaths reported in the past week, one was aged under 10 years while another was in their 20s.

On 13 March, 190 cases were hospitalised with five in intensive care units. The rolling seven-day average for new cases between 6 and 12 March was 1,644, compared with 1,632 reported in the week leading up to 6 March That same day, National Party leader and Leader of the Opposition Christopher Luxon tested positive for COVID-19; having tested positive previously in 2022.

On 20 March, 200 cases were hospitalised with eight in intensive care units. The seven-day rolling average leading up to 20 March was 1,593.

Notes

References

2023
2023 in New Zealand